Les Soirées de Nazelles, FP 84, is a set of variations for piano written by the French composer Francis Poulenc.  During the evenings, the composer used to sit at the piano and improvise "portraits" of his friends, all based on a given theme. The work was begun in 1930, and completed at Noizay on October 1, 1936. At the beginning of the score, it reads:

The composition is dedicated "to the memory of my aunt LIÉNARD, in memory of Nazelles". The score was published by Éditions Durand Salabert-Eschig.

Structure 
Les Soirées de Nazelles are composed of eight variations and a cadence, framed by a prelude (Preamble) and a finale. It takes about 20 minutes to perform. A complete recording by Tom Pascale lists the titles, tempo markings and durations as follows:

References

External links 
 Francis Poulenc - Les Soirées de Nazelles by Patrick Jankowski (18 November 2014)
 Les soirées de Nazelles, FP 84 (Poulenc, Francis) on IMSLP
 Poulenc - Soirées de Nazelles on Pianopedia
 Orazio Sciortino, piano. F. Poulenc- Les Soirées de Nazelles on YouTube
 Château de Noizelles

Compositions by Francis Poulenc
1936 compositions
Compositions for solo piano
Variations